Strongylosoma is a genus of millipedes belonging to the family Paradoxosomatidae.

The species of this genus are found in Eurasia, Australia.

Species

Species:

Strongylosoma aculeatum 
Strongylosoma alampes 
Strongylosoma asiaeminoris

References

Paradoxosomatidae